

i

ib

iba-ibr
ibacitabine (INN)
ibafloxacin (INN)
ibalizumab (INN)
ibandronic acid (INN)
ibazocine (INN)
ibipinabant (USAN, INN)
iboctadekin (USAN)
ibodutant (INN)
ibopamine (INN)
Ibrin (GE Healthcare)
ibrolipim (USAN)
ibrotamide (INN)

ibu
Ibu-Tab
Ibu
ibudilast (INN)
ibufenac (INN)
Ibuprin
Ibuprom (USP Zdrowie)
ibuprofen (INN)
ibuproxam (INN)
ibutamoren (INN)
ibuterol (INN)
ibutilide (INN)
ibuverine (INN)

ic-id
icatibant (INN)
iclaprim (INN)
iclazepam (INN)
icodextin (USAN)
icoduline (INN)
icometasone enbutate (INN)
icomucret (USAN)
icopezil (INN)
icosapent (INN)
icospiramide (INN)
icrocaptide (INN)
Idamycin (Adria Laboratories)
idarubicin (INN)
idaverine (INN)
idazoxan (INN)
idebenone (INN)
idenast (INN)
Idkit:HP (Exalenz Bioscience)
idoxifene (INN)
idoxuridine (INN)
idrabiotaparinux (INN)
idralfidine (INN)
idramantone (INN)
idraparinux (USAN)
idrapril (INN)
idrocilamide (INN)
idronoxil (USAN)
idropranolol (INN)
idursulfase (USAN)

if-il
ifenprodil (INN)
ifetroban (INN)
IFEX (Bristol-Myers Squibb)
ifosfamide (INN)
ifoxetine (INN)
iganidipine (INN)
igmesine (INN)
igovomab (INN)
Ilaris (Novartis)
ilatreotide (INN)
ilepatril (INN)
ilepcimide (INN)
Iletin (Eli Lilly and Company)
iliparcil (INN)
ilmofosine (INN)
ilodecakin (INN)
ilomastat (INN)
ilonidap (INN)
iloperidone (INN)
iloprost (INN)
Ilosone (Eli Lilly and Company/GlaxoSmithKline)